Donkey sentences are sentences that contain a pronoun with clear meaning (it is bound semantically) but whose syntactical role in the sentence poses challenges to grammarians. Such sentences defy straightforward attempts to generate their formal language equivalents. The difficulty is with understanding how English speakers parse such sentences.

Barker and Shan define a donkey pronoun as "a pronoun that lies outside the restrictor of a quantifier or the if-clause of a conditional, yet covaries with some quantificational element inside it, usually an indefinite." The pronoun in question is sometimes termed a donkey pronoun or donkey anaphora.

The following sentences are examples of donkey sentences.
"" ("Every man who owns a donkey sees it") — Walter Burley (1328), 
"Every farmer who owns a donkey beats it."
"Every police officer who arrested a murderer insulted him."

History
Walter Burley, a medieval scholastic philosopher, introduced donkey sentences in the context of the theory of suppositio, the medieval equivalent of reference theory.

Peter Geach reintroduced donkey sentences as a counterexample to Richard Montague's proposal for a generalized formal representation of quantification in natural language. His example was reused by David Lewis (1975), Gareth Evans (1977) and many others, and is still quoted in recent publications.

Analysis of donkey sentences
The goal of Montague grammar is to show how sentences of a natural language (like English) could be translated into a formal logical language, and so would then be amenable to mathematical analysis. Following Russell, it is typical to translate indefinite noun phrases using an existential quantifier,
as in the following simple example from Burchardt et al:

 "A woman smokes." is translated as 

The prototypical donkey sentence, "Every farmer who owns a donkey beats it.", requires careful consideration for adequate description (though reading "each" in place of "every" does simplify the formal analysis). The donkey pronoun in this case is the word it. Correctly translating this sentence will require using a universal quantifier for the indefinite noun phrase "a donkey", rather than the expected existential quantifier.

The naive first attempt at translation given below is not a well-formed sentence, since the variable  is left free in the predicate .

 

 

A correct translation into first-order logic for the donkey sentence seems to be

 ,

indicating that indefinites must sometimes be interpreted as existential quantifiers, and other times as universal quantifiers.

There is nothing wrong with donkey sentences: they are grammatically correct, they are well-formed and meaningful, and their syntax is regular. However, it is difficult to explain how donkey sentences produce their semantic results, and how those results generalize consistently with all other language use. If such an analysis were successful, it might allow a computer program to accurately translate natural language forms into logical form. It is unknown how natural language users are – apparently effortlessly – agreeing on the meaning of sentences such as the examples.

There may be several equivalent ways of describing this process. In fact, Hans Kamp (1981) and Irene Heim (1982) independently proposed very similar accounts in different terminology, which they called discourse representation theory (DRT) and file change semantics (FCS), respectively.

Theories of donkey anaphora
It is usual to distinguish two main kinds of theories about the semantics of donkey pronouns. The most classical proposals fall within the so-called description-theoretic approach, a label that is meant to encompass all the theories that treat the semantics of these pronouns as akin to, or derivative from, the semantics of definite descriptions. The second main family of proposals goes by the name dynamic theories, and they model donkey anaphora – and anaphora in general – on the assumption that the meaning of a sentence lies in its potential to change the context (understood as the information shared by the participants in a conversation).

Description-theoretic approaches

Description-theoretic approaches are theories of donkey pronouns in which definite descriptions play an important role. They were pioneered by Gareth Evans's E-type approach, which holds that donkey pronouns can be understood as referring terms whose reference is fixed by description.

For example, in "Every farmer who owns a donkey beats it.", the donkey pronoun "it" can be expanded as a definite description to yield "Every farmer who owns a donkey beats the donkey he/she owns." This expanded sentence can be interpreted along the lines of Russell's theory of descriptions.

Later authors have attributed an even larger role to definite descriptions, to the point of arguing that donkey pronouns have the semantics, and even the syntax, of definite descriptions. Approaches of the latter kind are usually called D-type.

Discourse representation theory

Donkey sentences became a major force in advancing semantic research in the 1980s, with the introduction of discourse representation theory (DRT). During that time, an effort was made to settle the inconsistencies which arose from the attempts to translate donkey sentences into first-order logic.

The solution that DRT provides for the donkey sentence problem can be roughly outlined as follows: The common semantic function of non-anaphoric noun phrases is the introduction of a new discourse referent, which is in turn available for the binding of anaphoric expressions. No quantifiers are introduced into the representation, thus overcoming the scope problem that the logical translations had.

Dynamic Predicate Logic

Dynamic Predicate Logic models pronouns as first-order logic variables, but allows quantifiers in a formula to bind variables in other formulae.

See also

References

Further reading

Abbott, Barbara. 'Donkey Demonstratives'. Natural Language Semantics 10 (2002): 285–298.
Barker, Chris. 'Individuation and Quantification'. Linguistic Inquiry 30 (1999): 683–691.
Barker, Chris. 'Presuppositions for Proportional Quantifiers'. Natural Language Semantics 4 (1996): 237–259.
Brasoveanu, Adrian. Structured Nominal and Modal Reference. Rutgers University PhD dissertation, 2007.
Brasoveanu, Adrian. 'Uniqueness Effects in Donkey Sentences and Correlatives'.Sinn und Bedeutung 12 (2007):1.
Burgess, John P. ' E Pluribus Unum: Plural Logic and Set Theory', Philosophia Mathematica 12 (2004): 193–221.
Cheng, Lisa LS and C.-T. James Huang. 'Two Types of Donkey Sentences'. Natural Language Semantics 4 (1996): 121–163.
Cohen, Ariel. Think Generic! Stanford, California: CSLI Publications, 1999.
Conway, L. and S. Crain. 'Donkey Anaphora in Child Grammar'. In Proceedings of the North East Linguistics Society (NELS) 25. University of Massachusetts Amherst, 1995.
Evans, Gareth. 'Pronouns'. Linguistic Inquiry 11 (1980): 337–362.
Geurts, Bart. Presuppositions and Pronouns. Oxford: Elsevier, 1999.
Harman, Gilbert. 'Anaphoric Pronouns as Bound Variables: Syntax or Semantics?' Language 52 (1976): 78–81.
Heim, Irene. 'E-Type Pronouns and Donkey Anaphora'. Linguistics and Philosophy 13 (1990): 137–177.
Just, MA. 'Comprehending Quantified Sentences: The Relation between Sentencepicture and Semantic Memory Verification'. Cognitive Psychology 6 (1974): 216–236.
Just, MA and PA Carpenter. 'Comprehension of Negation with Quantification'. Journal of Verbal Learning and Verbal Behavior 10 (1971): 244–253.
 Kadmon, N. Formal Pragmatics: Semantics, Pragmatics, Presupposition, and Focus. Oxford: Blackwell Publishers, 2001.
 Kamp, Hans and Reyle, U. From Discourse to Logic. Dordrecht: Kluwer, 1993.
Kanazawa, Makoto. 'Singular Donkey Pronouns Are Semantically Singular'. Linguistics and Philosophy 24 (2001): 383–403.
Kanazawa, Makoto. 'Weak vs. Strong Readings of Donkey Sentences and Monotonicity Inference in a Dynamic Setting'. Linguistics and Philosophy 17 (1994): 109–158.
Krifka, Manfred. 'Pragmatic Strengthening in Plural Predications and Donkey Sentences'. In Proceedings from Semantics and Linguistic Theory (SALT) 6. Ithaca, New York: Cornell University, 1996. Pages 136–153.
Lappin, Shalom. 'An Intensional Parametric Semantics for Vague Quantifiers'. Linguistics and Philosophy 23 (2000): 599–620.
Lappin, Shalom and Nissim Francez. 'E-type Pronouns, i-Sums, and Donkey Anaphora'. Linguistics and Philosophy 17 (1994): 391–428. 
Lappin, Shalom. 'Donkey Pronouns Unbound'. Theoretical Linguistics 15 (1989): 263–286.
Lewis, David. Parts of Classes, Oxford: Blackwell Publishing, 1991.
Lewis, David. 'General Semantics'. Synthese 22 (1970): 18–27.
Moltmann, Friederike. 'Unbound Anaphoric Pronouns: E-Type, Dynamic and Structured Propositions Approaches'. Synthese 153 (2006): 199–260.
Moltmann, Friederike. 'Presuppositions and Quantifier Domains'. Synthese 149 (2006): 179–224.
Montague, Richard. 'Universal Grammar'. Theoria 26 (1970): 373–398.
Neale, Stephen. Descriptions. Cambridge: MIT Press, 1990.
Neale, Stephen. 'Descriptive Pronouns and Donkey Anaphora'. Journal of Philosophy 87 (1990): 113–150.
Partee, Barbara H. 'Opacity, Coreference, and Pronouns'. Synthese 21 (1970): 359–385.
Quine, Willard Van Orman. Word and Object. Cambridge, Massachusetts: MIT Press, 1970.
Rooij, Robert van. 'Free Choice Counterfactual Donkeys'. Journal of Semantics 23 (2006): 383–402.
Yoon, Y-E. Weak and Strong Interpretations of Quantifiers and Definite NPs in English and Korean. University of Texas at Austin PhD dissertation, 1994.

Notes

External links
 The Handbook of Philosophical Logic
 Discourse Representation Theory
 Introduction to Discourse Representation Theory
 SEP Entry
 Archive of CSI 5386 Donkey Sentence Discussion
Barker, Chris. 'A Presuppositional Account of Proportional Ambiguity'. In Proceedings of Semantic and Linguistic Theory (SALT) 3. Ithaca, New York: Cornell University, 1993. Pages 1–18.
Brasoveanu, Adrian. 'Donkey Pluralities: Plural Information States vs. Non-Atomic Individuals'. In Proceedings of Sinn und Bedeutung 11. Edited by E. Puig-Waldmüller. Barcelona: Pompeu Fabra University, 2007. Pages 106–120.
Evans, Gareth. 'Pronouns, Quantifiers, and Relative Clauses (I)'. Canadian Journal of Philosophy 7 (1977): 467–536.
Geurts, Bart. 'Donkey Business'. Linguistics and Philosophy 25 (2002): 129–156.
Huang, C-T James. 'Logical Form'. Chapter 3 in Government and Binding Theory and the Minimalist Program: Principles and Parameters in Syntactic Theory edited by Gert Webelhuth. Oxford and Cambridge: Blackwell Publishing, 1995. Pages 127–177.
Kamp, Hans. 'A Theory of Truth and Semantic Representation'. In J. Groenendijk and others (eds.). Formal Methods in the Study of Language. Amsterdam: Mathematics Center, 1981.
Kitagawa, Yoshihisa. 'Copying Variables'. Chapter 2 in Functional Structure(s), Form and Interpretation: Perspectives from East Asian Languages. Edited by Yen-hui Audrey Li and others. Routledge, 2003. Pages 28–64.
Lewis, David. 'Adverbs of Quantification'. In Formal Semantics of Natural Language. Edited by Edward L Keenan. Cambridge: Cambridge University Press, 1975. Pages 3–15.
Montague, Richard. 'The Proper Treatment of Quantification in Ordinary English'. In KJJ Hintikka and others (eds). Proceedings of the 1970 Stanford Workshop on Grammar and Semantics. Dordrecht: Reidel, 1973. Pages 212–242.

Pronouns
Quantifier (logic)
Semantics
Formal semantics (natural language)